This is a list of moths of families starting from D to H that are found in Metropolitan France (including Corsica). It also acts as an index to the species articles and forms part of the full List of Lepidoptera of Metropolitan France.

Family Douglasiidae

Klimeschia transversella (Zeller, 1839)
Tinagma balteolella (Fischer von Röslerstamm, 1841)
Tinagma dryadis Staudinger, 1872
Tinagma ocnerostomella (Stainton, 1850)
Tinagma perdicella Zeller, 1839

Family Drepanidae

Achlya flavicornis (Linnaeus, 1758)
Asphalia ruficollis (Denis & Schiffermüller, 1775)
Cilix glaucata (Scopoli, 1763)
Cymatophorina diluta (Denis & Schiffermüller, 1775)
Drepana curvatula (Borkhausen, 1790)
Drepana falcataria (Linnaeus, 1758)
Falcaria lacertinaria (Linnaeus, 1758)
Habrosyne pyritoides (Hufnagel, 1766)
Ochropacha duplaris (Linnaeus, 1761)
Polyploca ridens (Fabricius, 1787)
Sabra harpagula (Esper, 1786)
Tethea ocularis (Linnaeus, 1767)
Tethea or (Denis & Schiffermüller, 1775)
Tetheella fluctuosa (Hübner, 1803)
Thyatira batis (Linnaeus, 1758)
Watsonalla binaria (Hufnagel, 1767)
Watsonalla cultraria (Fabricius, 1775)
Watsonalla uncinula (Borkhausen, 1790)

Family Elachistidae

Agonopterix adspersella (Kollar, 1832)
Agonopterix alpigena (Frey, 1870)
Agonopterix alstromeriana (Clerck, 1759)
Agonopterix angelicella (Hübner, 1813)
Agonopterix arenella (Denis & Schiffermüller, 1775)
Agonopterix aspersella (Constant, 1888)
Agonopterix assimilella (Treitschke, 1832)
Agonopterix astrantiae (Heinemann, 1870)
Agonopterix atomella (Denis & Schiffermüller, 1775)
Agonopterix bipunctosa (Curtis, 1850)
Agonopterix cadurciella (Chretien, 1914)
Agonopterix capreolella (Zeller, 1839)
Agonopterix carduella (Hübner, 1817)
Agonopterix cervariella (Constant, 1884)
Agonopterix chironiella (Constant, 1893)
Agonopterix ciliella (Stainton, 1849)
Agonopterix cnicella (Treitschke, 1832)
Agonopterix conterminella (Zeller, 1839)
Agonopterix curvipunctosa (Haworth, 1811)
Agonopterix cyrniella (Rebel, 1929)
Agonopterix doronicella (Wocke, 1849)
Agonopterix ferocella (Chretien, 1910)
Agonopterix ferulae (Zeller, 1847)
Agonopterix fruticosella (Walsingham, 1903)
Agonopterix furvella (Treitschke, 1832)
Agonopterix heracliana (Linnaeus, 1758)
Agonopterix hippomarathri (Nickerl, 1864)
Agonopterix irrorata (Staudinger, 1870)
Agonopterix kaekeritziana (Linnaeus, 1767)
Agonopterix laterella (Denis & Schiffermüller, 1775)
Agonopterix ligusticella (Chretien, 1908)
Agonopterix liturosa (Haworth, 1811)
Agonopterix nanatella (Stainton, 1849)
Agonopterix nervosa (Haworth, 1811)
Agonopterix nodiflorella (Milliere, 1866)
Agonopterix ocellana (Fabricius, 1775)
Agonopterix oinochroa (Turati, 1879)
Agonopterix pallorella (Zeller, 1839)
Agonopterix parilella (Treitschke, 1835)
Agonopterix perstrigella (Chretien, 1925)
Agonopterix petasitis (Standfuss, 1851)
Agonopterix propinquella (Treitschke, 1835)
Agonopterix purpurea (Haworth, 1811)
Agonopterix putridella (Denis & Schiffermüller, 1775)
Agonopterix rotundella (Douglas, 1846)
Agonopterix rutana (Fabricius, 1794)
Agonopterix scopariella (Heinemann, 1870)
Agonopterix selini (Heinemann, 1870)
Agonopterix senecionis (Nickerl, 1864)
Agonopterix seraphimella (Lhomme, 1929)
Agonopterix squamosa (Mann, 1864)
Agonopterix straminella (Staudinger, 1859)
Agonopterix subpropinquella (Stainton, 1849)
Agonopterix thapsiella (Zeller, 1847)
Agonopterix umbellana (Fabricius, 1794)
Agonopterix vendettella (Chretien, 1908)
Agonopterix yeatiana (Fabricius, 1781)
Anchinia cristalis (Scopoli, 1763)
Anchinia daphnella (Denis & Schiffermüller, 1775)
Anchinia grisescens Frey, 1856
Anchinia laureolella Herrich-Schäffer, 1854
Blastodacna atra (Haworth, 1828)
Blastodacna hellerella (Duponchel, 1838)
Blastodacna vinolentella (Herrich-Schäffer, 1854)
Cacochroa permixtella (Herrich-Schäffer, 1854)
Chrysoclista lathamella (T. B. Fletcher, 1936)
Chrysoclista linneella (Clerck, 1759)
Chrysoclista splendida Karsholt, 1997
Depressaria absynthiella Herrich-Schäffer, 1865
Depressaria adustatella Turati, 1927
Depressaria albipunctella (Denis & Schiffermüller, 1775)
Depressaria artemisiae Nickerl, 1864
Depressaria badiella (Hübner, 1796)
Depressaria beckmanni Heinemann, 1870
Depressaria bupleurella Heinemann, 1870
Depressaria chaerophylli Zeller, 1839
Depressaria corticinella Zeller, 1854
Depressaria daucella (Denis & Schiffermüller, 1775)
Depressaria daucivorella Ragonot, 1889
Depressaria depressana (Fabricius, 1775)
Depressaria deverrella Chretien, 1915
Depressaria discipunctella Herrich-Schäffer, 1854
Depressaria douglasella Stainton, 1849
Depressaria emeritella Stainton, 1849
Depressaria eryngiella Milliere, 1881
Depressaria gallicella Chretien, 1908
Depressaria halophilella Chretien, 1908
Depressaria heydenii Zeller, 1854
Depressaria hofmanni Stainton, 1861
Depressaria incognitella Hannemann, 1990
Depressaria libanotidella Schlager, 1849
Depressaria marcella Rebel, 1901
Depressaria millefoliella Chretien, 1908
Depressaria olerella Zeller, 1854
Depressaria pimpinellae Zeller, 1839
Depressaria pulcherrimella Stainton, 1849
Depressaria radiella (Goeze, 1783)
Depressaria radiosquamella Walsingham, 1898
Depressaria sordidatella Tengstrom, 1848
Depressaria tenebricosa Zeller, 1854
Depressaria ultimella Stainton, 1849
Depressaria ululana Rossler, 1866
Depressaria velox Staudinger, 1859
Depressaria erinaceella Staudinger, 1870
Dystebenna stephensi (Stainton, 1849)
Elachista adscitella Stainton, 1851
Elachista agelensis Traugott-Olsen, 1996
Elachista amparoae Traugott-Olsen, 1992
Elachista argentella (Clerck, 1759)
Elachista bedellella (Sircom, 1848)
Elachista bigorrensis Traugott-Olsen, 1990
Elachista bisulcella (Duponchel, 1843)
Elachista cahorsensis Traugott-Olsen, 1992
Elachista chrysodesmella Zeller, 1850
Elachista cingillella (Herrich-Schäffer, 1855)
Elachista clintoni Traugott-Olsen, 1992
Elachista collitella (Duponchel, 1843)
Elachista disemiella Zeller, 1847
Elachista dispilella Zeller, 1839
Elachista dispunctella (Duponchel, 1843)
Elachista exigua Parenti, 1978
Elachista gangabella Zeller, 1850
Elachista gormella Nielsen & Traugott-Olsen, 1987
Elachista hedemanni Rebel, 1899
Elachista heringi Rebel, 1899
Elachista klimeschiella Parenti, 2002
Elachista lerauti Traugott-Olsen, 1992
Elachista littoricola Le Marchand, 1938
Elachista lugdunensis Frey, 1859
Elachista metella Kaila, 2002
Elachista nitidulella (Herrich-Schäffer, 1885)
Elachista nolckeni Sulcs, 1992
Elachista obliquella Stainton, 1854
Elachista occulta Parenti, 1978
Elachista parvula Parenti, 1978
Elachista passerini Traugott-Olsen, 1996
Elachista pollinariella Zeller, 1839
Elachista pollutella Duponchel, 1843
Elachista pullicomella Zeller, 1839
Elachista revinctella Zeller, 1850
Elachista rudectella Stainton, 1851
Elachista squamosella (Duponchel, 1843)
Elachista subocellea (Stephens, 1834)
Elachista triseriatella Stainton, 1854
Elachista unifasciella (Haworth, 1828)
Elachista vanderwolfi Traugott-Olsen, 1992
Elachista varensis Traugott-Olsen, 1992
Elachista zuernbaueri Traugott-Olsen, 1990
Elachista albidella Nylander, 1848
Elachista albifrontella (Hübner, 1817)
Elachista alpinella Stainton, 1854
Elachista anserinella Zeller, 1839
Elachista anserinelloides Nel, 2003
Elachista apicipunctella Stainton, 1849
Elachista atricomella Stainton, 1849
Elachista biatomella (Stainton, 1848)
Elachista bifasciella Treitschke, 1833
Elachista canapennella (Hübner, 1813)
Elachista cinereopunctella (Haworth, 1828)
Elachista consortella Stainton, 1851
Elachista contaminatella Zeller, 1847
Elachista diederichsiella E. Hering, 1889
Elachista differens Parenti, 1978
Elachista dimicatella Rebel, 1903
Elachista eleochariella Stainton, 1851
Elachista exactella (Herrich-Schäffer, 1855)
Elachista freyerella (Hübner, 1825)
Elachista geminatella (Herrich-Schäffer, 1855)
Elachista glaserella Traugott-Olsen, 2000
Elachista gleichenella (Fabricius, 1781)
Elachista griseella (Duponchel, 1843)
Elachista herrichii Frey, 1859
Elachista humilis Zeller, 1850
Elachista igaloensis Amsel, 1951
Elachista lastrella Chretien, 1896
Elachista luticomella Zeller, 1839
Elachista maculicerusella (Bruand, 1859)
Elachista maculosella Chretien, 1896
Elachista nobilella Zeller, 1839
Elachista occidentalis Frey, 1882
Elachista pigerella (Herrich-Schäffer, 1854)
Elachista quadripunctella (Hübner, 1825)
Elachista rufocinerea (Haworth, 1828)
Elachista subnigrella Douglas, 1853
Elachista tetragonella (Herrich-Schäffer, 1855)
Elachista trapeziella Stainton, 1849
Elachista utonella Frey, 1856
Elachista zonulae Sruoga, 1992
Ethmia aurifluella (Hübner, 1810)
Ethmia bipunctella (Fabricius, 1775)
Ethmia candidella (Alphéraky, 1908)
Ethmia chrysopyga (Zeller, 1844)
Ethmia chrysopygella (Kolenati, 1846)
Ethmia dodecea (Haworth, 1828)
Ethmia flavianella (Treitschke, 1832)
Ethmia pusiella (Linnaeus, 1758)
Ethmia quadrillella (Goeze, 1783)
Ethmia terminella T. B. Fletcher, 1938
Exaeretia lutosella (Herrich-Schäffer, 1854)
Haplochrois buvati (Baldizzone, 1985)
Haplochrois ochraceella (Rebel, 1903)
Heinemannia albidorsella (Staudinger, 1877)
Heinemannia festivella (Denis & Schiffermüller, 1775)
Hypercallia citrinalis (Scopoli, 1763)
Levipalpus hepatariella (Lienig & Zeller, 1846)
Luquetia lobella (Denis & Schiffermüller, 1775)
Orophia denisella (Denis & Schiffermüller, 1775)
Orophia ferrugella (Denis & Schiffermüller, 1775)
Orophia sordidella (Hübner, 1796)
Perittia farinella (Thunberg, 1794)
Perittia herrichiella (Herrich-Schäffer, 1855)
Perittia obscurepunctella (Stainton, 1848)
Semioscopis avellanella (Hübner, 1793)
Semioscopis oculella (Thunberg, 1794)
Semioscopis steinkellneriana (Denis & Schiffermüller, 1775)
Semioscopis strigulana (Denis & Schiffermüller, 1775)
Spuleria flavicaput (Haworth, 1828)
Stephensia abbreviatella (Stainton, 1851)
Stephensia brunnichella (Linnaeus, 1767)
Telechrysis tripuncta (Haworth, 1828)

Family Endromidae

Endromis versicolora (Linnaeus, 1758)

Family Epermeniidae

Epermenia aequidentellus (E. Hofmann, 1867)
Epermenia chaerophyllella (Goeze, 1783)
Epermenia falciformis (Haworth, 1828)
Epermenia illigerella (Hübner, 1813)
Epermenia insecurella (Stainton, 1854)
Epermenia petrusellus (Heylaerts, 1883)
Epermenia strictellus (Wocke, 1867)
Epermenia devotella (Heyden, 1863)
Epermenia iniquellus (Wocke, 1867)
Epermenia pumila (Buvat & Nel, 2000)
Epermenia ochreomaculellus (Milliere, 1854)
Epermenia pontificella (Hübner, 1796)
Epermenia scurella (Stainton, 1851)
Ochromolopis ictella (Hübner, 1813)
Ochromolopis staintonellus (Milliere, 1869)
Phaulernis fulviguttella (Zeller, 1839)
Phaulernis laserinella Nel, 2003
Phaulernis rebeliella Gaedike, 1966
Phaulernis statariella (Heyden, 1863)

Family Erebidae

Amata kruegeri (Ragusa, 1904)
Amata phegea (Linnaeus, 1758)
Apaidia mesogona (Godart, 1824)
Apaidia rufeola (Rambur, 1832)
Apopestes spectrum (Esper, 1787)
Arctia caja (Linnaeus, 1758)
Arctia festiva (Hufnagel, 1766)
Arctia flavia (Fuessly, 1779)
Arctia villica (Linnaeus, 1758)
Arctornis l-nigrum (Muller, 1764)
Atlantarctia tigrina (Villers, 1789)
Atolmis rubricollis (Linnaeus, 1758)
Autophila dilucida (Hübner, 1808)
Autophila hirsuta (Staudinger, 1870)
Autophila limbata (Staudinger, 1871)
Autophila cataphanes (Hübner, 1813)
Callimorpha dominula (Linnaeus, 1758)
Calliteara pudibunda (Linnaeus, 1758)
Calymma communimacula (Denis & Schiffermüller, 1775)
Calyptra thalictri (Borkhausen, 1790)
Catephia alchymista (Denis & Schiffermüller, 1775)
Catocala coniuncta (Esper, 1787)
Catocala conversa (Esper, 1783)
Catocala dilecta (Hübner, 1808)
Catocala diversa (Geyer, 1828)
Catocala elocata (Esper, 1787)
Catocala fraxini (Linnaeus, 1758)
Catocala fulminea (Scopoli, 1763)
Catocala nupta (Linnaeus, 1767)
Catocala nymphaea (Esper, 1787)
Catocala nymphagoga (Esper, 1787)
Catocala optata (Godart, 1824)
Catocala promissa (Denis & Schiffermüller, 1775)
Catocala puerpera (Giorna, 1791)
Catocala sponsa (Linnaeus, 1767)
Chelis maculosa (Gerning, 1780)
Chelis simplonica (Boisduval, 1840)
Clytie illunaris (Hübner, 1813)
Colobochyla salicalis (Denis & Schiffermüller, 1775)
Coscinia bifasciata (Rambur, 1832)
Coscinia cribraria (Linnaeus, 1758)
Coscinia striata (Linnaeus, 1758)
Cybosia mesomella (Linnaeus, 1758)
Cymbalophora pudica (Esper, 1785)
Diacrisia sannio (Linnaeus, 1758)
Diaphora mendica (Clerck, 1759)
Diaphora sordida (Hübner, 1803)
Dicallomera fascelina (Linnaeus, 1758)
Drasteria cailino (Lefebvre, 1827)
Dysauxes ancilla (Linnaeus, 1767)
Dysauxes famula (Freyer, 1836)
Dysauxes punctata (Fabricius, 1781)
Dysgonia algira (Linnaeus, 1767)
Eilema caniola (Hübner, 1808)
Eilema complana (Linnaeus, 1758)
Eilema depressa (Esper, 1787)
Eilema griseola (Hübner, 1803)
Eilema lurideola (Zincken, 1817)
Eilema lutarella (Linnaeus, 1758)
Eilema palliatella (Scopoli, 1763)
Eilema pseudocomplana (Daniel, 1939)
Eilema pygmaeola (Doubleday, 1847)
Eilema sororcula (Hufnagel, 1766)
Eilema uniola (Rambur, 1866)
Eublemma amoena (Hübner, 1803)
Eublemma candidana (Fabricius, 1794)
Eublemma elychrysi (Rambur, 1833)
Eublemma himmighoffeni (Milliere, 1867)
Eublemma minutata (Fabricius, 1794)
Eublemma ostrina (Hübner, 1808)
Eublemma parva (Hübner, 1808)
Eublemma polygramma (Duponchel, 1842)
Eublemma pura (Hübner, 1813)
Eublemma purpurina (Denis & Schiffermüller, 1775)
Eublemma scitula Rambur, 1833
Euclidia mi (Clerck, 1759)
Euclidia glyphica (Linnaeus, 1758)
Euplagia quadripunctaria (Poda, 1761)
Euproctis chrysorrhoea (Linnaeus, 1758)
Euproctis similis (Fuessly, 1775)
Grammia quenseli (Paykull, 1791)
Grammodes bifasciata (Petagna, 1787)
Grammodes stolida (Fabricius, 1775)
Gynaephora selenitica (Esper, 1789)
Herminia grisealis (Denis & Schiffermüller, 1775)
Herminia tarsicrinalis (Knoch, 1782)
Herminia tarsipennalis (Treitschke, 1835)
Herminia tenuialis (Rebel, 1899)
Holoarctia cervini (Fallou, 1864)
Hypena crassalis (Fabricius, 1787)
Hypena lividalis (Hübner, 1796)
Hypena obesalis Treitschke, 1829
Hypena obsitalis (Hübner, 1813)
Hypena palpalis (Hübner, 1796)
Hypena proboscidalis (Linnaeus, 1758)
Hypena rostralis (Linnaeus, 1758)
Hypenodes humidalis Doubleday, 1850
Hyphantria cunea (Drury, 1773)
Hyphoraia aulica (Linnaeus, 1758)
Hyphoraia testudinaria (Geoffroy in Fourcroy, 1785)
Idia calvaria (Denis & Schiffermüller, 1775)
Laelia coenosa (Hübner, 1808)
Laspeyria flexula (Denis & Schiffermüller, 1775)
Leucoma salicis (Linnaeus, 1758)
Lithosia quadra (Linnaeus, 1758)
Lygephila craccae (Denis & Schiffermüller, 1775)
Lygephila lusoria (Linnaeus, 1758)
Lygephila pastinum (Treitschke, 1826)
Lygephila viciae (Hübner, 1822)
Lymantria atlantica (Rambur, 1837)
Lymantria dispar (Linnaeus, 1758)
Lymantria monacha (Linnaeus, 1758)
Macrochilo cribrumalis (Hübner, 1793)
Metachrostis dardouini (Boisduval, 1840)
Metachrostis velox (Hübner, 1813)
Miltochrista miniata (Forster, 1771)
Minucia lunaris (Denis & Schiffermüller, 1775)
Nodaria nodosalis (Herrich-Schäffer, 1851)
Nudaria mundana (Linnaeus, 1761)
Ocneria rubea (Denis & Schiffermüller, 1775)
Ocnogyna corsica (Rambur, 1832)
Ocnogyna parasita (Hübner, 1790)
Ocnogyna zoraida (Graslin, 1837)
Odice jucunda (Hübner, 1813)
Odice suava (Hübner, 1813)
Ophiusa tirhaca (Cramer, 1773)
Orectis massiliensis (Milliere, 1864)
Orgyia antiquoides (Hübner, 1822)
Orgyia aurolimbata Guenee, 1835
Orgyia corsica Boisduval, 1834
Orgyia recens (Hübner, 1819)
Orgyia rupestris Rambur, 1832
Orgyia trigotephras Boisduval, 1829
Orgyia antiqua (Linnaeus, 1758)
Paidia rica (Freyer, 1858)
Paracolax tristalis (Fabricius, 1794)
Parascotia fuliginaria (Linnaeus, 1761)
Parascotia nisseni Turati, 1905
Parasemia plantaginis (Linnaeus, 1758)
Parocneria detrita (Esper, 1785)
Pechipogo plumigeralis Hübner, 1825
Pechipogo strigilata (Linnaeus, 1758)
Pelosia muscerda (Hufnagel, 1766)
Pelosia obtusa (Herrich-Schäffer, 1852)
Pericallia matronula (Linnaeus, 1758)
Phragmatobia fuliginosa (Linnaeus, 1758)
Phragmatobia luctifera (Denis & Schiffermüller, 1775)
Phytometra viridaria (Clerck, 1759)
Polypogon gryphalis (Herrich-Schäffer, 1851)
Polypogon tentacularia (Linnaeus, 1758)
Rhypagla lacernaria (Hübner, 1813)
Rhyparia purpurata (Linnaeus, 1758)
Rhyparioides metelkana (Lederer, 1861)
Rivula sericealis (Scopoli, 1763)
Schrankia costaestrigalis (Stephens, 1834)
Schrankia taenialis (Hübner, 1809)
Scoliopteryx libatrix (Linnaeus, 1758)
Setema cereola (Hübner, 1803)
Setina aurita (Esper, 1787)
Setina flavicans (Geyer, 1836)
Setina irrorella (Linnaeus, 1758)
Setina roscida (Denis & Schiffermüller, 1775)
Spilosoma lubricipeda (Linnaeus, 1758)
Spilosoma lutea (Hufnagel, 1766)
Spilosoma urticae (Esper, 1789)
Tathorhynchus exsiccata (Lederer, 1855)
Thumatha senex (Hübner, 1808)
Trisateles emortualis (Denis & Schiffermüller, 1775)
Tyria jacobaeae (Linnaeus, 1758)
Utetheisa pulchella (Linnaeus, 1758)
Watsonarctia deserta (Bartel, 1902)
Zanclognatha lunalis (Scopoli, 1763)
Zanclognatha zelleralis (Wocke, 1850)
Zebeeba falsalis (Herrich-Schäffer, 1839)
Zethes insularis Rambur, 1833

Family Eriocottidae

Eriocottis nicolaeella Gibeaux, 1983
Eriocottis paradoxella (Staudinger, 1859)

Family Eriocraniidae

Dyseriocrania subpurpurella (Haworth, 1828)
Eriocrania cicatricella (Zetterstedt, 1839)
Eriocrania salopiella (Stainton, 1854)
Eriocrania sangii (Wood, 1891)
Eriocrania semipurpurella (Stephens, 1835)
Eriocrania sparrmannella (Bosc, 1791)
Heringocrania unimaculella (Zetterstedt, 1839)
Paracrania chrysolepidella (Zeller, 1851)

Family Euteliidae

Eutelia adulatrix (Hübner, 1813)

Family Gelechiidae

Acompsia antirrhinella Milliere, 1866
Acompsia cinerella (Clerck, 1759)
Acompsia delmastroella Huemer, 1998
Acompsia dimorpha Petry, 1904
Acompsia minorella Rebel, 1899
Acompsia muellerrutzi Wehrli, 1925
Acompsia pyrenaella Huemer & Karsholt, 2002
Acompsia tripunctella (Denis & Schiffermüller, 1775)
Acompsia schmidtiellus (Heyden, 1848)
Altenia scriptella (Hübner, 1796)
Anacampsis blattariella (Hübner, 1796)
Anacampsis hirsutella (Constant, 1885)
Anacampsis obscurella (Denis & Schiffermüller, 1775)
Anacampsis populella (Clerck, 1759)
Anacampsis scintillella (Fischer von Röslerstamm, 1841)
Anacampsis temerella (Lienig & Zeller, 1846)
Anacampsis timidella (Wocke, 1887)
Anacampsis trifoliella (Constant, 1890)
Anarsia bilbainella (Rossler, 1877)
Anarsia dejoannisi Real, 1994
Anarsia leberonella Real, 1994
Anarsia lineatella Zeller, 1839
Anarsia spartiella (Schrank, 1802)
Anasphaltis renigerellus (Zeller, 1839)
Apatetris mediterranella Nel & Varenne, 2012
Apodia bifractella (Duponchel, 1843)
Aproaerema anthyllidella (Hübner, 1813)
Argolamprotes micella (Denis & Schiffermüller, 1775)
Aristotelia billii Varenne & J. Nel, 2013
Aristotelia brizella (Treitschke, 1833)
Aristotelia decoratella (Staudinger, 1879)
Aristotelia decurtella (Hübner, 1813)
Aristotelia ericinella (Zeller, 1839)
Aristotelia frankeniae Walsingham, 1898
Aristotelia heliacella (Herrich-Schäffer, 1854)
Aristotelia staticella Milliere, 1876
Aristotelia subdecurtella (Stainton, 1859)
Aristotelia subericinella (Duponchel, 1843)
Aroga aristotelis (Milliere, 1876)
Aroga flavicomella (Zeller, 1839)
Aroga pascuicola (Staudinger, 1871)
Aroga temporariella Sattler, 1960
Aroga velocella (Duponchel, 1838)
Athrips amoenella (Frey, 1882)
Athrips asarinella (Chretien, 1930)
Athrips medjella (Chretien, 1900)
Athrips mouffetella (Linnaeus, 1758)
Athrips nigricostella (Duponchel, 1842)
Athrips pruinosella (Lienig & Zeller, 1846)
Athrips rancidella (Herrich-Schäffer, 1854)
Athrips tetrapunctella (Thunberg, 1794)
Athrips thymifoliella (Constant, 1893)
Atremaea lonchoptera Staudinger, 1871
Brachmia blandella (Fabricius, 1798)
Brachmia dimidiella (Denis & Schiffermüller, 1775)
Brachmia inornatella (Douglas, 1850)
Bryotropha affinis (Haworth, 1828)
Bryotropha arabica Amsel, 1952
Bryotropha basaltinella (Zeller, 1839)
Bryotropha boreella (Douglas, 1851)
Bryotropha desertella (Douglas, 1850)
Bryotropha domestica (Haworth, 1828)
Bryotropha dryadella (Zeller, 1850)
Bryotropha figulella (Staudinger, 1859)
Bryotropha galbanella (Zeller, 1839)
Bryotropha gallurella Amsel, 1952
Bryotropha pallorella Amsel, 1952
Bryotropha plebejella (Zeller, 1847)
Bryotropha politella (Stainton, 1851)
Bryotropha sattleri Nel, 2003
Bryotropha senectella (Zeller, 1839)
Bryotropha similis (Stainton, 1854)
Bryotropha terrella (Denis & Schiffermüller, 1775)
Bryotropha umbrosella (Zeller, 1839)
Bryotropha vondermuhlli Nel & Brusseaux, 2003
Carpatolechia aenigma (Sattler, 1983)
Carpatolechia alburnella (Zeller, 1839)
Carpatolechia decorella (Haworth, 1812)
Carpatolechia fugacella (Zeller, 1839)
Carpatolechia fugitivella (Zeller, 1839)
Carpatolechia notatella (Hübner, 1813)
Carpatolechia proximella (Hübner, 1796)
Caryocolum albifaciella (Heinemann, 1870)
Caryocolum alsinella (Zeller, 1868)
Caryocolum blandella (Douglas, 1852)
Caryocolum blandelloides Karsholt, 1981
Caryocolum blandulella (Tutt, 1887)
Caryocolum bosalella (Rebel, 1936)
Caryocolum cassella (Walker, 1864)
Caryocolum cauligenella (Schmid, 1863)
Caryocolum dauphini Grange & Nel, 2012
Caryocolum delphinatella (Constant, 1890)
Caryocolum fibigerium Huemer, 1988
Caryocolum fischerella (Treitschke, 1833)
Caryocolum fraternella (Douglas, 1851)
Caryocolum gallagenellum Huemer, 1989
Caryocolum huebneri (Haworth, 1828)
Caryocolum interalbicella (Herrich-Schäffer, 1854)
Caryocolum junctella (Douglas, 1851)
Caryocolum klosi (Rebel, 1917)
Caryocolum kroesmanniella (Herrich-Schäffer, 1854)
Caryocolum leucomelanella (Zeller, 1839)
Caryocolum leucothoracellum (Klimesch, 1953)
Caryocolum marmorea (Haworth, 1828)
Caryocolum mazeli Huemer & Nel, 2005
Caryocolum moehringiae (Klimesch, 1954)
Caryocolum mucronatella (Chretien, 1900)
Caryocolum peregrinella (Herrich-Schäffer, 1854)
Caryocolum petrophila (Preissecker, 1914)
Caryocolum petryi (O. Hofmann, 1899)
Caryocolum provinciella (Stainton, 1869)
Caryocolum proxima (Haworth, 1828)
Caryocolum repentis Huemer & Luquet, 1992
Caryocolum saginella (Zeller, 1868)
Caryocolum schleichi (Christoph, 1872)
Caryocolum tischeriella (Zeller, 1839)
Caryocolum tricolorella (Haworth, 1812)
Caryocolum vicinella (Douglas, 1851)
Caryocolum viscariella (Stainton, 1855)
Catatinagma trivittellum Rebel, 1903
Caulastrocecis gypsella (Constant, 1893)
Chionodes apolectella (Walsingham, 1900)
Chionodes continuella (Zeller, 1839)
Chionodes distinctella (Zeller, 1839)
Chionodes electella (Zeller, 1839)
Chionodes fumatella (Douglas, 1850)
Chionodes holosericella (Herrich-Schäffer, 1854)
Chionodes lugubrella (Fabricius, 1794)
Chionodes nebulosella (Heinemann, 1870)
Chionodes perpetuella (Herrich-Schäffer, 1854)
Chionodes tragicella (Heyden, 1865)
Chionodes viduella (Fabricius, 1794)
Chrysoesthia atriplicella (Amsel, 1939)
Chrysoesthia drurella (Fabricius, 1775)
Chrysoesthia eppelsheimi (Staudinger, 1885)
Chrysoesthia sexguttella (Thunberg, 1794)
Coleotechnites piceaella (Kearfott, 1903)
Cosmardia moritzella (Treitschke, 1835)
Crossobela trinotella (Herrich-Schäffer, 1856)
Dactylotula altithermella (Walsingham, 1903)
Dactylotula kinkerella (Snellen, 1876)
Deltophora stictella (Rebel, 1927)
Dichomeris acuminatus (Staudinger, 1876)
Dichomeris alacella (Zeller, 1839)
Dichomeris derasella (Denis & Schiffermüller, 1775)
Dichomeris helianthemi (Walsingham, 1903)
Dichomeris juniperella (Linnaeus, 1761)
Dichomeris lamprostoma (Zeller, 1847)
Dichomeris limbipunctellus (Staudinger, 1859)
Dichomeris limosellus (Schlager, 1849)
Dichomeris marginella (Fabricius, 1781)
Dichomeris rasilella (Herrich-Schäffer, 1854)
Dichomeris ustalella (Fabricius, 1794)
Ephysteris deserticolella (Staudinger, 1871)
Ephysteris diminutella (Zeller, 1847)
Ephysteris iberica Povolny, 1977
Ephysteris insulella (Heinemann, 1870)
Ephysteris inustella (Zeller, 1847)
Ephysteris olympica Povolny, 1968
Ephysteris promptella (Staudinger, 1859)
Epidola barcinonella Milliere, 1867
Epidola nuraghella Hartig, 1939
Epidola stigma Staudinger, 1859
Eulamprotes atrella (Denis & Schiffermüller, 1775)
Eulamprotes buvati Leraut, 1991
Eulamprotes helotella (Staudinger, 1859)
Eulamprotes immaculatella (Douglas, 1850)
Eulamprotes libertinella (Zeller, 1872)
Eulamprotes mirusella Huemer & Karsholt, 2013
Eulamprotes nigromaculella (Milliere, 1872)
Eulamprotes occidentella Huemer & Karsholt, 2011
Eulamprotes parahelotella Nel, 1995
Eulamprotes superbella (Zeller, 1839)
Eulamprotes unicolorella (Duponchel, 1843)
Eulamprotes wilkella (Linnaeus, 1758)
Exoteleia dodecella (Linnaeus, 1758)
Exoteleia succinctella (Zeller, 1872)
Filatima angustipennis Sattler, 1961
Filatima spurcella (Duponchel, 1843)
Filatima tephritidella (Duponchel, 1844)
Filatima textorella (Chretien, 1908)
Gelechia asinella (Hübner, 1796)
Gelechia aspoecki Huemer, 1992
Gelechia basipunctella Herrich-Schäffer, 1854
Gelechia dujardini Huemer, 1991
Gelechia hippophaella (Schrank, 1802)
Gelechia mediterranea Huemer, 1991
Gelechia muscosella Zeller, 1839
Gelechia nervosella (Zerny, 1927)
Gelechia nigra (Haworth, 1828)
Gelechia rhombella (Denis & Schiffermüller, 1775)
Gelechia sabinellus (Zeller, 1839)
Gelechia scotinella Herrich-Schäffer, 1854
Gelechia senticetella (Staudinger, 1859)
Gelechia sestertiella Herrich-Schäffer, 1854
Gelechia sororculella (Hübner, 1817)
Gelechia turpella (Denis & Schiffermüller, 1775)
Gladiovalva rumicivorella (Milliere, 1881)
Gnorimoschema epithymella (Staudinger, 1859)
Gnorimoschema herbichii (Nowicki, 1864)
Gnorimoschema soffneri Riedl, 1965
Gnorimoschema steueri Povolny, 1975
Gnorimoschema valesiella (Staudinger, 1877)
Helcystogramma lineolella (Zeller, 1839)
Helcystogramma lutatella (Herrich-Schäffer, 1854)
Helcystogramma rufescens (Haworth, 1828)
Helcystogramma triannulella (Herrich-Schäffer, 1854)
Hypatima rhomboidella (Linnaeus, 1758)
Isophrictis anthemidella (Wocke, 1871)
Isophrictis corsicella Amsel, 1936
Isophrictis invisella (Constant, 1885)
Isophrictis kefersteiniellus (Zeller, 1850)
Isophrictis lineatellus (Zeller, 1850)
Isophrictis meridionella (Herrich-Schäffer, 1854)
Isophrictis robinella (Chretien, 1907)
Isophrictis striatella (Denis & Schiffermüller, 1775)
Istrianis myricariella (Frey, 1870)
Iwaruna biguttella (Duponchel, 1843)
Iwaruna klimeschi Wolff, 1958
Klimeschiopsis kiningerella (Duponchel, 1843)
Megacraspedus balneariellus (Chretien, 1907)
Megacraspedus cuencellus Caradja, 1920
Megacraspedus dolosellus (Zeller, 1839)
Megacraspedus fallax (Mann, 1867)
Megacraspedus lanceolellus (Zeller, 1850)
Megacraspedus pentheres Walsingham, 1920
Megacraspedus separatellus (Fischer von Röslerstamm, 1843)
Megacraspedus subdolellus Staudinger, 1859
Megacraspedus tristictus Walsingham, 1910
Megacraspedus tutti Walsingham, 1897
Mesophleps corsicella Herrich-Schäffer, 1856
Mesophleps ochracella (Turati, 1926)
Mesophleps oxycedrella (Milliere, 1871)
Mesophleps silacella (Hübner, 1796)
Metzneria aestivella (Zeller, 1839)
Metzneria aprilella (Herrich-Schäffer, 1854)
Metzneria artificella (Herrich-Schäffer, 1861)
Metzneria campicolella (Mann, 1857)
Metzneria diffusella Englert, 1974
Metzneria ehikeella Gozmany, 1954
Metzneria hilarella Caradja, 1920
Metzneria intestinella (Mann, 1864)
Metzneria lappella (Linnaeus, 1758)
Metzneria littorella (Douglas, 1850)
Metzneria metzneriella (Stainton, 1851)
Metzneria neuropterella (Zeller, 1839)
Metzneria paucipunctella (Zeller, 1839)
Metzneria santolinella (Amsel, 1936)
Metzneria staehelinella Englert, 1974
Metzneria subflavella Englert, 1974
Metzneria tenuiella (Mann, 1864)
Metzneria tristella Rebel, 1901
Metzneria varennei Nel, 1997
Microlechia chretieni Turati, 1924
Mirificarma burdonella (Rebel, 1930)
Mirificarma cytisella (Treitschke, 1833)
Mirificarma eburnella (Denis & Schiffermüller, 1775)
Mirificarma flavella (Duponchel, 1844)
Mirificarma interrupta (Curtis, 1827)
Mirificarma lentiginosella (Zeller, 1839)
Mirificarma maculatella (Hübner, 1796)
Mirificarma mulinella (Zeller, 1839)
Mirificarma ulicinella (Staudinger, 1859)
Monochroa arundinetella (Boyd, 1857)
Monochroa bronzella Karsholt, Nel, Fournier, Varenne & Huemer, 2013
Monochroa conspersella (Herrich-Schäffer, 1854)
Monochroa cytisella (Curtis, 1837)
Monochroa dellabeffai (Rebel, 1932)
Monochroa divisella (Douglas, 1850)
Monochroa elongella (Heinemann, 1870)
Monochroa ferrea (Frey, 1870)
Monochroa hornigi (Staudinger, 1883)
Monochroa inflexella Svensson, 1992
Monochroa lucidella (Stephens, 1834)
Monochroa lutulentella (Zeller, 1839)
Monochroa melagonella (Constant, 1895)
Monochroa palustrellus (Douglas, 1850)
Monochroa parvulata (Gozmany, 1957)
Monochroa rumicetella (O. Hofmann, 1868)
Monochroa sperata Huemer & Karsholt, 2010
Monochroa suffusella (Douglas, 1850)
Monochroa tenebrella (Hübner, 1817)
Neofaculta ericetella (Geyer, 1832)
Neofaculta infernella (Herrich-Schäffer, 1854)
Neofriseria peliella (Treitschke, 1835)
Neofriseria singula (Staudinger, 1876)
Neotelphusa cisti (Stainton, 1869)
Neotelphusa huemeri Nel, 1998
Neotelphusa sequax (Haworth, 1828)
Nothris congressariella (Bruand, 1858)
Nothris lemniscellus (Zeller, 1839)
Nothris verbascella (Denis & Schiffermüller, 1775)
Oecocecis guyonella Guenee, 1870
Ornativalva plutelliformis (Staudinger, 1859)
Ornativalva pseudotamaricella Sattler, 1967
Palumbina guerinii (Stainton, 1858)
Parachronistis albiceps (Zeller, 1839)
Paranarsia joannisiella Ragonot, 1895
Parapodia sinaica (Frauenfeld, 1859)
Parastenolechia nigrinotella (Zeller, 1847)
Pexicopia malvella (Hübner, 1805)
Phthorimaea operculella (Zeller, 1873)
Platyedra subcinerea (Haworth, 1828)
Pogochaetia solitaria Staudinger, 1879
Prolita sexpunctella (Fabricius, 1794)
Prolita solutella (Zeller, 1839)
Psamathocrita osseella (Stainton, 1860)
Pseudosophronia constanti (Nel, 1998)
Pseudosophronia cosmella Constant, 1885
Pseudosophronia exustellus (Zeller, 1847)
Pseudotelphusa occidentella Huemer & Karsholt, 1999
Pseudotelphusa paripunctella (Thunberg, 1794)
Pseudotelphusa scalella (Scopoli, 1763)
Pseudotelphusa tessella (Linnaeus, 1758)
Psoricoptera gibbosella (Zeller, 1839)
Psoricoptera speciosella Teich, 1893
Ptocheuusa inopella (Zeller, 1839)
Ptocheuusa paupella (Zeller, 1847)
Pyncostola bohemiella (Nickerl, 1864)
Recurvaria leucatella (Clerck, 1759)
Recurvaria nanella (Denis & Schiffermüller, 1775)
Recurvaria thomeriella (Chretien, 1901)
Sattleria angustispina Pitkin & Sattler, 1991
Sattleria arcuata Pitkin & Sattler, 1991
Sattleria breviramus Pitkin & Sattler, 1991
Sattleria izoardi Huemer & Sattler, 1992
Sattleria marguareisi Huemer & Sattler, 1992
Sattleria melaleucella (Constant, 1865)
Sattleria pyrenaica (Petry, 1904)
Sattleria triglavica Povolny, 1987
Schistophila laurocistella Chretien, 1899
Scrobipalpa acuminatella (Sircom, 1850)
Scrobipalpa amseli Povolny, 1966
Scrobipalpa artemisiella (Treitschke, 1833)
Scrobipalpa atriplicella (Fischer von Röslerstamm, 1841)
Scrobipalpa bigoti Povolny, 1973
Scrobipalpa bradleyi Povolny, 1971
Scrobipalpa brahmiella (Heyden, 1862)
Scrobipalpa camphorosmella Nel, 1999
Scrobipalpa costella (Humphreys & Westwood, 1845)
Scrobipalpa ergasima (Meyrick, 1916)
Scrobipalpa gallicella (Constant, 1885)
Scrobipalpa halimioniella Huemer & Karsholt, 2010
Scrobipalpa halonella (Herrich-Schäffer, 1854)
Scrobipalpa halymella (Milliere, 1864)
Scrobipalpa hyoscyamella (Stainton, 1869)
Scrobipalpa hyssopi Nel, 2003
Scrobipalpa instabilella (Douglas, 1846)
Scrobipalpa monochromella (Constant, 1895)
Scrobipalpa montanella (Chretien, 1910)
Scrobipalpa murinella (Duponchel, 1843)
Scrobipalpa nitentella (Fuchs, 1902)
Scrobipalpa obsoletella (Fischer von Röslerstamm, 1841)
Scrobipalpa ocellatella (Boyd, 1858)
Scrobipalpa pauperella (Heinemann, 1870)
Scrobipalpa perinii (Klimesch, 1951)
Scrobipalpa phagnalella (Constant, 1895)
Scrobipalpa portosanctana (Stainton, 1859)
Scrobipalpa proclivella (Fuchs, 1886)
Scrobipalpa salicorniae (E. Hering, 1889)
Scrobipalpa salinella (Zeller, 1847)
Scrobipalpa samadensis (Pfaffenzeller, 1870)
Scrobipalpa spergulariella (Chretien, 1910)
Scrobipalpa suaedella (Richardson, 1893)
Scrobipalpa suaedicola (Mabille, 1906)
Scrobipalpa suasella (Constant, 1895)
Scrobipalpa superstes Povolny, 1977
Scrobipalpa traganella (Chretien, 1915)
Scrobipalpa vasconiella (Rossler, 1877)
Scrobipalpa voltinella (Chretien, 1898)
Scrobipalpula diffluella (Frey, 1870)
Scrobipalpula psilella (Herrich-Schäffer, 1854)
Scrobipalpula ramosella (Muller-Rutz, 1934)
Scrobipalpula tussilaginis (Stainton, 1867)
Sitotroga cerealella (Olivier, 1789)
Sitotroga psacasta Meyrick, 1908
Sophronia chilonella (Treitschke, 1833)
Sophronia humerella (Denis & Schiffermüller, 1775)
Sophronia semicostella (Hübner, 1813)
Sophronia sicariellus (Zeller, 1839)
Stenolechia gemmella (Linnaeus, 1758)
Stenolechiodes pseudogemmellus Elsner, 1996
Stomopteryx basalis (Staudinger, 1876)
Stomopteryx detersella (Zeller, 1847)
Stomopteryx flavipalpella Jackh, 1959
Stomopteryx hungaricella Gozmany, 1957
Stomopteryx remissella (Zeller, 1847)
Syncopacma albifrontella (Heinemann, 1870)
Syncopacma albipalpella (Herrich-Schäffer, 1854)
Syncopacma buvati Nel, 1995
Syncopacma captivella (Herrich-Schäffer, 1854)
Syncopacma cinctella (Clerck, 1759)
Syncopacma cincticulella (Bruand, 1851)
Syncopacma coronillella (Treitschke, 1833)
Syncopacma larseniella Gozmany, 1957
Syncopacma linella (Chretien, 1904)
Syncopacma montanata Gozmany, 1957
Syncopacma patruella (Mann, 1857)
Syncopacma polychromella (Rebel, 1902)
Syncopacma sangiella (Stainton, 1863)
Syncopacma suecicella (Wolff, 1958)
Syncopacma taeniolella (Zeller, 1839)
Teleiodes italica Huemer, 1992
Teleiodes luculella (Hübner, 1813)
Teleiodes saltuum (Zeller, 1878)
Teleiodes vulgella (Denis & Schiffermüller, 1775)
Teleiodes wagae (Nowicki, 1860)
Teleiopsis albifemorella (E. Hofmann, 1867)
Teleiopsis bagriotella (Duponchel, 1840)
Teleiopsis diffinis (Haworth, 1828)
Teleiopsis rosalbella (Fologne, 1862)
Telphusa cistiflorella (Constant, 1890)
Thiotricha coleella (Constant, 1885)
Thiotricha majorella (Rebel, 1910)
Thiotricha subocellea (Stephens, 1834)
Tila capsophilella (Chretien, 1900)
Tuta absoluta (Meyrick, 1917)
Xenolechia aethiops (Humphreys & Westwood, 1845)
Xystophora carchariella (Zeller, 1839)
Xystophora pulveratella (Herrich-Schäffer, 1854)

Family Geometridae

Abraxas grossulariata (Linnaeus, 1758)
Abraxas pantaria (Linnaeus, 1767)
Abraxas sylvata (Scopoli, 1763)
Acasis appensata (Eversmann, 1842)
Acasis viretata (Hübner, 1799)
Adactylotis contaminaria (Hübner, 1813)
Adactylotis gesticularia (Hübner, 1817)
Adalbertia castiliaria (Staudinger, 1900)
Aethalura punctulata (Denis & Schiffermüller, 1775)
Agriopis aurantiaria (Hübner, 1799)
Agriopis bajaria (Denis & Schiffermüller, 1775)
Agriopis leucophaearia (Denis & Schiffermüller, 1775)
Agriopis marginaria (Fabricius, 1776)
Alcis bastelbergeri (Hirschke, 1908)
Alcis jubata (Thunberg, 1788)
Alcis repandata (Linnaeus, 1758)
Aleucis distinctata (Herrich-Schäffer, 1839)
Alsophila aceraria (Denis & Schiffermüller, 1775)
Alsophila aescularia (Denis & Schiffermüller, 1775)
Angerona prunaria (Linnaeus, 1758)
Anthometra plumularia Boisduval, 1840
Anticlea derivata (Denis & Schiffermüller, 1775)
Anticollix sparsata (Treitschke, 1828)
Antilurga alhambrata (Staudinger, 1859)
Apeira syringaria (Linnaeus, 1758)
Aplasta ononaria (Fuessly, 1783)
Aplocera corsalta (Schawerda, 1928)
Aplocera efformata (Guenee, 1858)
Aplocera plagiata (Linnaeus, 1758)
Aplocera praeformata (Hübner, 1826)
Aplocera simpliciata (Treitschke, 1835)
Apocheima hispidaria (Denis & Schiffermüller, 1775)
Archiearis parthenias (Linnaeus, 1761)
Arichanna melanaria (Linnaeus, 1758)
Ascotis selenaria (Denis & Schiffermüller, 1775)
Aspitates gilvaria (Denis & Schiffermüller, 1775)
Aspitates ochrearia (Rossi, 1794)
Asthena albulata (Hufnagel, 1767)
Asthena anseraria (Herrich-Schäffer, 1855)
Athroolopha pennigeraria (Hübner, 1813)
Baptria tibiale (Esper, 1791)
Biston betularia (Linnaeus, 1758)
Biston strataria (Hufnagel, 1767)
Boudinotiana notha (Hübner, 1803)
Boudinotiana touranginii (Berce, 1870)
Bupalus piniaria (Linnaeus, 1758)
Cabera exanthemata (Scopoli, 1763)
Cabera pusaria (Linnaeus, 1758)
Calamodes occitanaria (Duponchel, 1829)
Campaea honoraria (Denis & Schiffermüller, 1775)
Campaea margaritaria (Linnaeus, 1761)
Camptogramma bilineata (Linnaeus, 1758)
Camptogramma scripturata (Hübner, 1799)
Carsia lythoxylata (Hübner, 1799)
Carsia sororiata (Hübner, 1813)
Casilda consecraria (Staudinger, 1871)
Cataclysme dissimilata (Rambur, 1833)
Cataclysme riguata (Hübner, 1813)
Cataclysme uniformata (Bellier, 1862)
Catarhoe basochesiata (Duponchel, 1831)
Catarhoe cuculata (Hufnagel, 1767)
Catarhoe mazeli Viidalepp, 2008
Catarhoe permixtaria (Herrich-Schäffer, 1856)
Catarhoe putridaria (Herrich-Schäffer, 1852)
Catarhoe rubidata (Denis & Schiffermüller, 1775)
Cepphis advenaria (Hübner, 1790)
Chariaspilates formosaria (Eversmann, 1837)
Charissa bellieri (Oberthur, 1913)
Charissa obscurata (Denis & Schiffermüller, 1775)
Charissa crenulata (Staudinger, 1871)
Charissa italohelveticus (Rezbanyai-Reser, 1986)
Charissa pullata (Denis & Schiffermüller, 1775)
Charissa corsica (Oberthur, 1913)
Charissa mucidaria (Hübner, 1799)
Charissa variegata (Duponchel, 1830)
Charissa ambiguata (Duponchel, 1830)
Charissa onustaria (Herrich-Schäffer, 1852)
Charissa glaucinaria (Hübner, 1799)
Chemerina caliginearia (Rambur, 1833)
Chesias isabella Schawerda, 1915
Chesias legatella (Denis & Schiffermüller, 1775)
Chesias rufata (Fabricius, 1775)
Chiasmia aestimaria (Hübner, 1809)
Chiasmia clathrata (Linnaeus, 1758)
Chlorissa cloraria (Hübner, 1813)
Chlorissa viridata (Linnaeus, 1758)
Chloroclysta miata (Linnaeus, 1758)
Chloroclysta siterata (Hufnagel, 1767)
Chloroclystis v-ata (Haworth, 1809)
Cidaria fulvata (Forster, 1771)
Cleora cinctaria (Denis & Schiffermüller, 1775)
Cleorodes lichenaria (Hufnagel, 1767)
Cleta filacearia (Herrich-Schäffer, 1847)
Coenocalpe lapidata (Hübner, 1809)
Coenocalpe millierata (Staudinger, 1901)
Coenotephria ablutaria (Boisduval, 1840)
Coenotephria salicata (Denis & Schiffermüller, 1775)
Coenotephria tophaceata (Denis & Schiffermüller, 1775)
Colostygia aptata (Hübner, 1813)
Colostygia aqueata (Hübner, 1813)
Colostygia cyrnea (Wehrli, 1925)
Colostygia kollariaria (Herrich-Schäffer, 1848)
Colostygia laetaria (de La Harpe, 1853)
Colostygia multistrigaria (Haworth, 1809)
Colostygia olivata (Denis & Schiffermüller, 1775)
Colostygia pectinataria (Knoch, 1781)
Colostygia stilpna (Prout, 1924)
Colostygia turbata (Hübner, 1799)
Colotois pennaria (Linnaeus, 1761)
Comibaena bajularia (Denis & Schiffermüller, 1775)
Compsoptera jourdanaria (Serres, 1826)
Compsoptera opacaria (Hübner, 1819)
Cosmorhoe ocellata (Linnaeus, 1758)
Costaconvexa polygrammata (Borkhausen, 1794)
Crocallis dardoinaria Donzel, 1840
Crocallis elinguaria (Linnaeus, 1758)
Crocallis tusciaria (Borkhausen, 1793)
Crocota peletieraria (Duponchel, 1830)
Crocota pseudotinctaria Leraut, 1999
Crocota tinctaria (Hübner, 1799)
Cyclophora linearia (Hübner, 1799)
Cyclophora porata (Linnaeus, 1767)
Cyclophora punctaria (Linnaeus, 1758)
Cyclophora suppunctaria (Zeller, 1847)
Cyclophora albiocellaria (Hübner, 1789)
Cyclophora albipunctata (Hufnagel, 1767)
Cyclophora annularia (Fabricius, 1775)
Cyclophora pendularia (Clerck, 1759)
Cyclophora puppillaria (Hübner, 1799)
Cyclophora quercimontaria (Bastelberger, 1897)
Cyclophora ruficiliaria (Herrich-Schäffer, 1855)
Deileptenia ribeata (Clerck, 1759)
Digrammia rippertaria (Duponchel, 1830)
Dyscia conspersaria (Denis & Schiffermüller, 1775)
Dyscia innocentaria (Christoph, 1885)
Dyscia raunaria (Freyer, 1852)
Dyscia fagaria (Thunberg, 1784)
Dyscia penulataria (Hübner, 1819)
Dyscia lentiscaria (Donzel, 1837)
Dysstroma citrata (Linnaeus, 1761)
Dysstroma truncata (Hufnagel, 1767)
Earophila badiata (Denis & Schiffermüller, 1775)
Ecleora solieraria (Rambur, 1834)
Ecliptopera capitata (Herrich-Schäffer, 1839)
Ecliptopera silaceata (Denis & Schiffermüller, 1775)
Ectropis crepuscularia (Denis & Schiffermüller, 1775)
Ekboarmia fascinataria (Staudinger, 1900)
Ekboarmia sagnesi Dufay, 1979
Electrophaes corylata (Thunberg, 1792)
Elophos caelibaria (Heydenreich, 1851)
Elophos unicoloraria (Staudinger, 1871)
Elophos dilucidaria (Denis & Schiffermüller, 1775)
Elophos dognini (Thierry-Mieg, 1910)
Elophos serotinaria (Denis & Schiffermüller, 1775)
Elophos sproengertsi (Pungeler, 1914)
Elophos vittaria (Thunberg, 1788)
Ematurga atomaria (Linnaeus, 1758)
Emmiltis pygmaearia (Hübner, 1809)
Ennomos alniaria (Linnaeus, 1758)
Ennomos autumnaria (Werneburg, 1859)
Ennomos erosaria (Denis & Schiffermüller, 1775)
Ennomos fuscantaria (Haworth, 1809)
Ennomos quercaria (Hübner, 1813)
Ennomos quercinaria (Hufnagel, 1767)
Entephria caesiata (Denis & Schiffermüller, 1775)
Entephria contestata (Vorbrodt & Muller-Rutz, 1913)
Entephria cyanata (Hübner, 1809)
Entephria flavicinctata (Hübner, 1813)
Entephria infidaria (de La Harpe, 1853)
Entephria nobiliaria (Herrich-Schäffer, 1852)
Epilobophora sabinata (Geyer, 1831)
Epione repandaria (Hufnagel, 1767)
Epione vespertaria (Linnaeus, 1767)
Epirranthis diversata (Denis & Schiffermüller, 1775)
Epirrhoe alternata (Muller, 1764)
Epirrhoe galiata (Denis & Schiffermüller, 1775)
Epirrhoe hastulata (Hübner, 1790)
Epirrhoe molluginata (Hübner, 1813)
Epirrhoe pupillata (Thunberg, 1788)
Epirrhoe rivata (Hübner, 1813)
Epirrhoe timozzaria (Constant, 1884)
Epirrhoe tristata (Linnaeus, 1758)
Epirrita autumnata (Borkhausen, 1794)
Epirrita christyi (Allen, 1906)
Epirrita dilutata (Denis & Schiffermüller, 1775)
Erannis defoliaria (Clerck, 1759)
Euchoeca nebulata (Scopoli, 1763)
Eucrostes indigenata (de Villers, 1789)
Eulithis mellinata (Fabricius, 1787)
Eulithis populata (Linnaeus, 1758)
Eulithis prunata (Linnaeus, 1758)
Eulithis testata (Linnaeus, 1761)
Euphyia biangulata (Haworth, 1809)
Euphyia frustata (Treitschke, 1828)
Euphyia unangulata (Haworth, 1809)
Eupithecia abbreviata Stephens, 1831
Eupithecia abietaria (Goeze, 1781)
Eupithecia absinthiata (Clerck, 1759)
Eupithecia actaeata Walderdorff, 1869
Eupithecia alliaria Staudinger, 1870
Eupithecia analoga Djakonov, 1926
Eupithecia assimilata Doubleday, 1856
Eupithecia breviculata (Donzel, 1837)
Eupithecia carpophagata Staudinger, 1871
Eupithecia cauchiata (Duponchel, 1831)
Eupithecia centaureata (Denis & Schiffermüller, 1775)
Eupithecia cocciferata Milliere, 1864
Eupithecia conterminata (Lienig, 1846)
Eupithecia cooptata Dietze, 1903
Eupithecia cretaceata (Packard, 1874)
Eupithecia denotata (Hübner, 1813)
Eupithecia denticulata (Treitschke, 1828)
Eupithecia dissertata (Pungeler, 1905)
Eupithecia distinctaria Herrich-Schäffer, 1848
Eupithecia dodoneata Guenee, 1858
Eupithecia druentiata Dietze, 1902
Eupithecia egenaria Herrich-Schäffer, 1848
Eupithecia ericeata (Rambur, 1833)
Eupithecia exiguata (Hübner, 1813)
Eupithecia expallidata Doubleday, 1856
Eupithecia extraversaria Herrich-Schäffer, 1852
Eupithecia extremata (Fabricius, 1787)
Eupithecia gemellata Herrich-Schäffer, 1861
Eupithecia graphata (Treitschke, 1828)
Eupithecia gratiosata Herrich-Schäffer, 1861
Eupithecia gueneata Milliere, 1862
Eupithecia haworthiata Doubleday, 1856
Eupithecia icterata (de Villers, 1789)
Eupithecia immundata (Lienig, 1846)
Eupithecia impurata (Hübner, 1813)
Eupithecia indigata (Hübner, 1813)
Eupithecia innotata (Hufnagel, 1767)
Eupithecia insigniata (Hübner, 1790)
Eupithecia intricata (Zetterstedt, 1839)
Eupithecia inturbata (Hübner, 1817)
Eupithecia irriguata (Hübner, 1813)
Eupithecia lanceata (Hübner, 1825)
Eupithecia laquaearia Herrich-Schäffer, 1848
Eupithecia lariciata (Freyer, 1841)
Eupithecia lentiscata Mabille, 1869
Eupithecia liguriata Milliere, 1884
Eupithecia linariata (Denis & Schiffermüller, 1775)
Eupithecia massiliata Milliere, 1865
Eupithecia millefoliata Rossler, 1866
Eupithecia nanata (Hübner, 1813)
Eupithecia orphnata W. Petersen, 1909
Eupithecia oxycedrata (Rambur, 1833)
Eupithecia pauxillaria Boisduval, 1840
Eupithecia pernotata Guenee, 1858
Eupithecia phoeniceata (Rambur, 1834)
Eupithecia pimpinellata (Hübner, 1813)
Eupithecia plumbeolata (Haworth, 1809)
Eupithecia poecilata Pungeler, 1888
Eupithecia pulchellata Stephens, 1831
Eupithecia pusillata (Denis & Schiffermüller, 1775)
Eupithecia pygmaeata (Hübner, 1799)
Eupithecia pyreneata Mabille, 1871
Eupithecia rosmarinata Dardoin & Milliere, 1865
Eupithecia santolinata Mabille, 1871
Eupithecia sardoa Dietze, 1910
Eupithecia satyrata (Hübner, 1813)
Eupithecia schiefereri Bohatsch, 1893
Eupithecia scopariata (Rambur, 1833)
Eupithecia selinata Herrich-Schäffer, 1861
Eupithecia semigraphata Bruand, 1850
Eupithecia senorita Mironov, 2003
Eupithecia silenata Assmann, 1848
Eupithecia silenicolata Mabille, 1867
Eupithecia simpliciata (Haworth, 1809)
Eupithecia spissilineata (Metzner, 1846)
Eupithecia subfuscata (Haworth, 1809)
Eupithecia subumbrata (Denis & Schiffermüller, 1775)
Eupithecia succenturiata (Linnaeus, 1758)
Eupithecia tantillaria Boisduval, 1840
Eupithecia tenuiata (Hübner, 1813)
Eupithecia thalictrata (Pungeler, 1902)
Eupithecia tripunctaria Herrich-Schäffer, 1852
Eupithecia trisignaria Herrich-Schäffer, 1848
Eupithecia ultimaria Boisduval, 1840
Eupithecia undata (Freyer, 1840)
Eupithecia unedonata Mabille, 1868
Eupithecia valerianata (Hübner, 1813)
Eupithecia variostrigata Alphéraky, 1876
Eupithecia venosata (Fabricius, 1787)
Eupithecia veratraria Herrich-Schäffer, 1848
Eupithecia virgaureata Doubleday, 1861
Eupithecia vulgata (Haworth, 1809)
Eupithecia weissi Prout, 1938
Eurranthis plummistaria (de Villers, 1789)
Eustroma reticulata (Denis & Schiffermüller, 1775)
Fagivorina arenaria (Hufnagel, 1767)
Gagitodes sagittata (Fabricius, 1787)
Gandaritis pyraliata (Denis & Schiffermüller, 1775)
Geometra papilionaria (Linnaeus, 1758)
Glacies alpinata (Scopoli, 1763)
Glacies alticolaria (Mann, 1853)
Glacies bentelii (Ratzer, 1890)
Glacies canaliculata (Hochenwarth, 1785)
Glacies coracina (Esper, 1805)
Glacies noricana (Wagner, 1898)
Gnopharmia stevenaria (Boisduval, 1840)
Gnophos sartata Treitschke, 1827
Gnophos furvata (Denis & Schiffermüller, 1775)
Gnophos obfuscata (Denis & Schiffermüller, 1775)
Gnophos dumetata Treitschke, 1827
Gymnoscelis rufifasciata (Haworth, 1809)
Gypsochroa renitidata (Hübner, 1817)
Heliomata glarearia (Denis & Schiffermüller, 1775)
Hemistola chrysoprasaria (Esper, 1795)
Hemithea aestivaria (Hübner, 1789)
Horisme aemulata (Hübner, 1813)
Horisme aquata (Hübner, 1813)
Horisme calligraphata (Herrich-Schäffer, 1838)
Horisme corticata (Treitschke, 1835)
Horisme radicaria (de La Harpe, 1855)
Horisme tersata (Denis & Schiffermüller, 1775)
Horisme vitalbata (Denis & Schiffermüller, 1775)
Hospitalia flavolineata (Staudinger, 1883)
Hydrelia flammeolaria (Hufnagel, 1767)
Hydrelia sylvata (Denis & Schiffermüller, 1775)
Hydria cervinalis (Scopoli, 1763)
Hydria montivagata (Duponchel, 1830)
Hydria undulata (Linnaeus, 1758)
Hydriomena furcata (Thunberg, 1784)
Hydriomena impluviata (Denis & Schiffermüller, 1775)
Hydriomena ruberata (Freyer, 1831)
Hylaea fasciaria (Linnaeus, 1758)
Hylaea pinicolaria (Bellier, 1861)
Hypomecis punctinalis (Scopoli, 1763)
Hypomecis roboraria (Denis & Schiffermüller, 1775)
Hypoxystis pluviaria (Fabricius, 1787)
Idaea alyssumata (Milliere, 1871)
Idaea attenuaria (Rambur, 1833)
Idaea aureolaria (Denis & Schiffermüller, 1775)
Idaea aversata (Linnaeus, 1758)
Idaea belemiata (Milliere, 1868)
Idaea biselata (Hufnagel, 1767)
Idaea calunetaria (Staudinger, 1859)
Idaea carvalhoi Herbulot, 1979
Idaea cervantaria (Milliere, 1869)
Idaea circuitaria (Hübner, 1819)
Idaea contiguaria (Hübner, 1799)
Idaea degeneraria (Hübner, 1799)
Idaea determinata (Staudinger, 1876)
Idaea deversaria (Herrich-Schäffer, 1847)
Idaea dilutaria (Hübner, 1799)
Idaea dimidiata (Hufnagel, 1767)
Idaea distinctaria (Boisduval, 1840)
Idaea dromikos Hausmann, 2004
Idaea efflorata Zeller, 1849
Idaea elongaria (Rambur, 1833)
Idaea emarginata (Linnaeus, 1758)
Idaea eugeniata (Dardoin & Milliere, 1870)
Idaea exilaria (Guenee, 1858)
Idaea filicata (Hübner, 1799)
Idaea flaveolaria (Hübner, 1809)
Idaea fuscovenosa (Goeze, 1781)
Idaea humiliata (Hufnagel, 1767)
Idaea incalcarata (Chretien, 1913)
Idaea infirmaria (Rambur, 1833)
Idaea inquinata (Scopoli, 1763)
Idaea joannisiata (Homberg, 1911)
Idaea laevigata (Scopoli, 1763)
Idaea libycata (Bartel, 1906)
Idaea litigiosaria (Boisduval, 1840)
Idaea longaria (Herrich-Schäffer, 1852)
Idaea luteolaria (Constant, 1863)
Idaea macilentaria (Herrich-Schäffer, 1847)
Idaea mancipiata (Staudinger, 1871)
Idaea mediaria (Hübner, 1819)
Idaea moniliata (Denis & Schiffermüller, 1775)
Idaea muricata (Hufnagel, 1767)
Idaea mustelata (Gumppenberg, 1892)
Idaea nitidata (Herrich-Schäffer, 1861)
Idaea obliquaria (Turati, 1913)
Idaea obsoletaria (Rambur, 1833)
Idaea ochrata (Scopoli, 1763)
Idaea ostrinaria (Hübner, 1813)
Idaea pallidata (Denis & Schiffermüller, 1775)
Idaea politaria (Hübner, 1799)
Idaea predotaria (Hartig, 1951)
Idaea rhodogrammaria (Pungeler, 1913)
Idaea rubraria (Staudinger, 1901)
Idaea rufaria (Hübner, 1799)
Idaea rusticata (Denis & Schiffermüller, 1775)
Idaea sardoniata (Homberg, 1912)
Idaea seriata (Schrank, 1802)
Idaea sericeata (Hübner, 1813)
Idaea serpentata (Hufnagel, 1767)
Idaea spissilimbaria (Mabille, 1888)
Idaea squalidaria (Staudinger, 1882)
Idaea straminata (Borkhausen, 1794)
Idaea subsaturata (Guenee, 1858)
Idaea subsericeata (Haworth, 1809)
Idaea sylvestraria (Hübner, 1799)
Idaea trigeminata (Haworth, 1809)
Idaea typicata (Guenee, 1858)
Idaea vesubiata (Milliere, 1873)
Isturgia arenacearia (Denis & Schiffermüller, 1775)
Isturgia assimilaria (Rambur, 1833)
Isturgia famula (Esper, 1787)
Isturgia limbaria (Fabricius, 1775)
Isturgia miniosaria (Duponchel, 1829)
Isturgia murinaria (Denis & Schiffermüller, 1775)
Isturgia roraria (Fabricius, 1776)
Itame vincularia (Hübner, 1813)
Jodis lactearia (Linnaeus, 1758)
Jodis putata (Linnaeus, 1758)
Lampropteryx otregiata (Metcalfe, 1917)
Lampropteryx suffumata (Denis & Schiffermüller, 1775)
Larentia clavaria (Haworth, 1809)
Larentia malvata (Rambur, 1833)
Ligdia adustata (Denis & Schiffermüller, 1775)
Liodesina homochromata (Mabille, 1869)
Lithostege duponcheli Prout, 1938
Lithostege griseata (Denis & Schiffermüller, 1775)
Lobophora halterata (Hufnagel, 1767)
Lomaspilis marginata (Linnaeus, 1758)
Lomographa bimaculata (Fabricius, 1775)
Lomographa temerata (Denis & Schiffermüller, 1775)
Lycia alpina (Sulzer, 1776)
Lycia hirtaria (Clerck, 1759)
Lycia isabellae (Harrison, 1914)
Lycia pomonaria (Hübner, 1790)
Lycia zonaria (Denis & Schiffermüller, 1775)
Lythria cruentaria (Hufnagel, 1767)
Lythria plumularia (Freyer, 1831)
Lythria purpuraria (Linnaeus, 1758)
Lythria sanguinaria (Duponchel, 1842)
Macaria alternata (Denis & Schiffermüller, 1775)
Macaria artesiaria (Denis & Schiffermüller, 1775)
Macaria brunneata (Thunberg, 1784)
Macaria carbonaria (Clerck, 1759)
Macaria fusca (Thunberg, 1792)
Macaria liturata (Clerck, 1759)
Macaria notata (Linnaeus, 1758)
Macaria signaria (Hübner, 1809)
Macaria wauaria (Linnaeus, 1758)
Martania taeniata (Stephens, 1831)
Melanthia alaudaria (Freyer, 1846)
Melanthia procellata (Denis & Schiffermüller, 1775)
Menophra abruptaria (Thunberg, 1792)
Menophra harterti (Rothschild, 1912)
Menophra japygiaria (O. Costa, 1849)
Menophra nycthemeraria (Geyer, 1831)
Mesoleuca albicillata (Linnaeus, 1758)
Mesotype didymata (Linnaeus, 1758)
Mesotype parallelolineata (Retzius, 1783)
Mesotype verberata (Scopoli, 1763)
Microloxia herbaria (Hübner, 1813)
Minoa murinata (Scopoli, 1763)
Nebula achromaria (de La Harpe, 1853)
Nebula ibericata (Staudinger, 1871)
Nebula nebulata (Treitschke, 1828)
Nothocasis sertata (Hübner, 1817)
Nychiodes obscuraria (de Villers, 1789)
Nycterosea obstipata (Fabricius, 1794)
Oar reaumuraria (Milliere, 1864)
Odezia atrata (Linnaeus, 1758)
Odontopera bidentata (Clerck, 1759)
Onychora agaritharia (Dardoin, 1842)
Operophtera brumata (Linnaeus, 1758)
Operophtera fagata (Scharfenberg, 1805)
Opisthograptis luteolata (Linnaeus, 1758)
Orthonama vittata (Borkhausen, 1794)
Ourapteryx sambucaria (Linnaeus, 1758)
Pachycnemia benesignata (Bellier, 1861)
Pachycnemia hippocastanaria (Hübner, 1799)
Pachycnemia tibiaria (Rambur, 1829)
Paraboarmia viertlii (Bohatsch, 1883)
Paradarisa consonaria (Hübner, 1799)
Parectropis similaria (Hufnagel, 1767)
Pareulype berberata (Denis & Schiffermüller, 1775)
Pareulype casearia (Constant, 1884)
Pasiphila chloerata (Mabille, 1870)
Pasiphila debiliata (Hübner, 1817)
Pasiphila rectangulata (Linnaeus, 1758)
Pelurga comitata (Linnaeus, 1758)
Pennithera firmata (Hübner, 1822)
Pennithera ulicata (Rambur, 1934)
Perconia strigillaria (Hübner, 1787)
Peribatodes abstersaria (Boisduval, 1840)
Peribatodes buxicolaria (Mabille, 1873)
Peribatodes ilicaria (Geyer, 1833)
Peribatodes perversaria (Boisduval, 1840)
Peribatodes rhomboidaria (Denis & Schiffermüller, 1775)
Peribatodes secundaria (Denis & Schiffermüller, 1775)
Peribatodes subflavaria (Milliere, 1876)
Peribatodes umbraria (Hübner, 1809)
Perizoma affinitata (Stephens, 1831)
Perizoma albulata (Denis & Schiffermüller, 1775)
Perizoma alchemillata (Linnaeus, 1758)
Perizoma bifaciata (Haworth, 1809)
Perizoma blandiata (Denis & Schiffermüller, 1775)
Perizoma flavofasciata (Thunberg, 1792)
Perizoma hydrata (Treitschke, 1829)
Perizoma incultaria (Herrich-Schäffer, 1848)
Perizoma juracolaria (Wehrli, 1919)
Perizoma lugdunaria (Herrich-Schäffer, 1855)
Perizoma minorata (Treitschke, 1828)
Perizoma obsoletata (Herrich-Schäffer, 1838)
Petrophora binaevata (Mabille, 1869)
Petrophora chlorosata (Scopoli, 1763)
Petrophora convergata (de Villers, 1789)
Petrophora narbonea (Linnaeus, 1767)
Phaiogramma etruscaria (Zeller, 1849)
Phaiogramma faustinata (Milliere, 1868)
Phibalapteryx virgata (Hufnagel, 1767)
Phigalia pilosaria (Denis & Schiffermüller, 1775)
Philereme transversata (Hufnagel, 1767)
Philereme vetulata (Denis & Schiffermüller, 1775)
Plagodis dolabraria (Linnaeus, 1767)
Plagodis pulveraria (Linnaeus, 1758)
Plemyria rubiginata (Denis & Schiffermüller, 1775)
Protorhoe corollaria (Herrich-Schäffer, 1848)
Pseudopanthera macularia (Linnaeus, 1758)
Pseudoterpna coronillaria (Hübner, 1817)
Pseudoterpna corsicaria (Rambur, 1833)
Pseudoterpna pruinata (Hufnagel, 1767)
Psodos quadrifaria (Sulzer, 1776)
Pterapherapteryx sexalata (Retzius, 1783)
Pungeleria capreolaria (Denis & Schiffermüller, 1775)
Rheumaptera hastata (Linnaeus, 1758)
Rheumaptera subhastata (Nolcken, 1870)
Rhodometra sacraria (Linnaeus, 1767)
Rhodostrophia calabra (Petagna, 1786)
Rhodostrophia vibicaria (Clerck, 1759)
Rhoptria asperaria (Hübner, 1817)
Sardocyrnia bastelicaria (Bellier, 1862)
Schistostege decussata (Denis & Schiffermüller, 1775)
Sciadia tenebraria (Esper, 1806)
Scopula alba Hausmann, 1993
Scopula asellaria (Herrich-Schäffer, 1847)
Scopula confinaria (Herrich-Schäffer, 1847)
Scopula emutaria (Hübner, 1809)
Scopula floslactata (Haworth, 1809)
Scopula imitaria (Hübner, 1799)
Scopula immutata (Linnaeus, 1758)
Scopula incanata (Linnaeus, 1758)
Scopula marginepunctata (Goeze, 1781)
Scopula minorata (Boisduval, 1833)
Scopula rubellata (Gumppenberg, 1892)
Scopula rufomixtaria (de Graslin, 1863)
Scopula subpunctaria (Herrich-Schäffer, 1847)
Scopula ternata Schrank, 1802
Scopula caricaria (Reutti, 1853)
Scopula corrivalaria (Kretschmar, 1862)
Scopula decorata (Denis & Schiffermüller, 1775)
Scopula honestata (Mabille, 1869)
Scopula immorata (Linnaeus, 1758)
Scopula nemoraria (Hübner, 1799)
Scopula nigropunctata (Hufnagel, 1767)
Scopula ornata (Scopoli, 1763)
Scopula rubiginata (Hufnagel, 1767)
Scopula submutata (Treitschke, 1828)
Scopula tessellaria (Boisduval, 1840)
Scopula turbidaria (Hübner, 1819)
Scopula umbelaria (Hübner, 1813)
Scopula virgulata (Denis & Schiffermüller, 1775)
Scotopteryx alfacaria (Staudinger, 1859)
Scotopteryx angularia (de Villers, 1789)
Scotopteryx bipunctaria (Denis & Schiffermüller, 1775)
Scotopteryx chenopodiata (Linnaeus, 1758)
Scotopteryx coarctaria (Denis & Schiffermüller, 1775)
Scotopteryx coelinaria (de Graslin, 1863)
Scotopteryx luridata (Hufnagel, 1767)
Scotopteryx moeniata (Scopoli, 1763)
Scotopteryx mucronata (Scopoli, 1763)
Scotopteryx obvallaria (Mabille, 1867)
Scotopteryx octodurensis (Favre, 1903)
Scotopteryx peribolata (Hübner, 1817)
Scotopteryx proximaria (Rambur, 1833)
Scotopteryx vicinaria (Duponchel, 1830)
Selenia dentaria (Fabricius, 1775)
Selenia lunularia (Hübner, 1788)
Selenia tetralunaria (Hufnagel, 1767)
Selidosema brunnearia (de Villers, 1789)
Selidosema taeniolaria (Hübner, 1813)
Siona lineata (Scopoli, 1763)
Solitanea mariae (Stauder, 1921)
Spargania luctuata (Denis & Schiffermüller, 1775)
Stegania cararia (Hübner, 1790)
Stegania trimaculata (de Villers, 1789)
Synopsia sociaria (Hübner, 1799)
Tephronia codetaria (Oberthur, 1881)
Tephronia cyrnea (Schawerda, 1932)
Tephronia oranaria Staudinger, 1892
Tephronia sepiaria (Hufnagel, 1767)
Thalera fimbrialis (Scopoli, 1763)
Thera britannica (Turner, 1925)
Thera cognata (Thunberg, 1792)
Thera cupressata (Geyer, 1831)
Thera juniperata (Linnaeus, 1758)
Thera obeliscata (Hübner, 1787)
Thera variata (Denis & Schiffermüller, 1775)
Thera vetustata (Denis & Schiffermüller, 1775)
Theria primaria (Haworth, 1809)
Theria rupicapraria (Denis & Schiffermüller, 1775)
Thetidia smaragdaria (Fabricius, 1787)
Thetidia plusiaria Boisduval, 1840
Timandra comae Schmidt, 1931
Trichopteryx carpinata (Borkhausen, 1794)
Trichopteryx polycommata (Denis & Schiffermüller, 1775)
Triphosa dubitata (Linnaeus, 1758)
Triphosa sabaudiata (Duponchel, 1830)
Triphosa tauteli Leraut, 2008
Venusia blomeri (Curtis, 1832)
Venusia cambrica Curtis, 1839
Xanthorhoe biriviata (Borkhausen, 1794)
Xanthorhoe decoloraria (Esper, 1806)
Xanthorhoe designata (Hufnagel, 1767)
Xanthorhoe ferrugata (Clerck, 1759)
Xanthorhoe fluctuata (Linnaeus, 1758)
Xanthorhoe incursata (Hübner, 1813)
Xanthorhoe montanata (Denis & Schiffermüller, 1775)
Xanthorhoe oxybiata (Milliere, 1872)
Xanthorhoe quadrifasiata (Clerck, 1759)
Xanthorhoe spadicearia (Denis & Schiffermüller, 1775)
Xenochlorodes olympiaria (Herrich-Schäffer, 1852)

Family Glyphipterigidae

Acrolepia autumnitella Curtis, 1838
Acrolepiopsis assectella (Zeller, 1839)
Acrolepiopsis marcidella (Curtis, 1850)
Acrolepiopsis vesperella (Zeller, 1850)
Digitivalva arnicella (Heyden, 1863)
Digitivalva eglanteriella (Mann, 1855)
Digitivalva perlepidella (Stainton, 1849)
Digitivalva valeriella (Snellen, 1878)
Digitivalva granitella (Treitschke, 1833)
Digitivalva occidentella (Klimesch, 1956)
Digitivalva pulicariae (Klimesch, 1956)
Digitivalva solidaginis (Staudinger, 1859)
Glyphipterix argyroguttella Ragonot, 1885
Glyphipterix bergstraesserella (Fabricius, 1781)
Glyphipterix equitella (Scopoli, 1763)
Glyphipterix forsterella (Fabricius, 1781)
Glyphipterix fuscoviridella (Haworth, 1828)
Glyphipterix gianelliella Ragonot, 1885
Glyphipterix haworthana (Stephens, 1834)
Glyphipterix heptaglyphella Le Marchand, 1925
Glyphipterix nicaeella Moschler, 1866
Glyphipterix schoenicolella Boyd, 1859
Glyphipterix simpliciella (Stephens, 1834)
Glyphipterix thrasonella (Scopoli, 1763)
Orthotelia sparganella (Thunberg, 1788)

Family Gracillariidae

Acrocercops brongniardella (Fabricius, 1798)
Acrocercops cocciferellum (Chretien, 1910)
Aspilapteryx limosella (Duponchel, 1843)
Aspilapteryx tringipennella (Zeller, 1839)
Callisto coffeella (Zetterstedt, 1839)
Callisto denticulella (Thunberg, 1794)
Callisto pfaffenzelleri (Frey, 1856)
Caloptilia alchimiella (Scopoli, 1763)
Caloptilia azaleella (Brants, 1913)
Caloptilia betulicola (M. Hering, 1928)
Caloptilia coruscans (Walsingham, 1907)
Caloptilia cuculipennella (Hübner, 1796)
Caloptilia elongella (Linnaeus, 1761)
Caloptilia falconipennella (Hübner, 1813)
Caloptilia fidella (Reutti, 1853)
Caloptilia fribergensis (Fritzsche, 1871)
Caloptilia hauderi (Rebel, 1906)
Caloptilia hemidactylella (Denis & Schiffermüller, 1775)
Caloptilia populetorum (Zeller, 1839)
Caloptilia robustella Jackh, 1972
Caloptilia roscipennella (Hübner, 1796)
Caloptilia rufipennella (Hübner, 1796)
Caloptilia semifascia (Haworth, 1828)
Caloptilia stigmatella (Fabricius, 1781)
Calybites phasianipennella (Hübner, 1813)
Cameraria ohridella Deschka & Dimic, 1986
Dialectica imperialella (Zeller, 1847)
Dialectica scalariella (Zeller, 1850)
Euspilapteryx auroguttella Stephens, 1835
Gracillaria loriolella Frey, 1881
Gracillaria syringella (Fabricius, 1794)
Leucospilapteryx omissella (Stainton, 1848)
Macarostola miniella (Felder & Rogenhofer, 1875)
Mercantouria neli Huemer, Lopez-Vaamonde & Triberti, 2016
Metriochroa latifoliella (Milliere, 1886)
Micrurapteryx kollariella (Zeller, 1839)
Ornixola caudulatella (Zeller, 1839)
Parectopa ononidis (Zeller, 1839)
Parectopa robiniella Clemens, 1863
Parornix alpicola (Wocke, 1877)
Parornix ampliatella (Stainton, 1850)
Parornix anglicella (Stainton, 1850)
Parornix betulae (Stainton, 1854)
Parornix carpinella (Frey, 1863)
Parornix devoniella (Stainton, 1850)
Parornix fagivora (Frey, 1861)
Parornix finitimella (Zeller, 1850)
Parornix petiolella (Frey, 1863)
Parornix polygrammella (Wocke, 1862)
Parornix scoticella (Stainton, 1850)
Parornix torquillella (Zeller, 1850)
Phyllocnistis labyrinthella (Bjerkander, 1790)
Phyllocnistis saligna (Zeller, 1839)
Phyllocnistis unipunctella (Stephens, 1834)
Phyllocnistis xenia M. Hering, 1936
Phyllonorycter abrasella (Duponchel, 1843)
Phyllonorycter acaciella (Duponchel, 1843)
Phyllonorycter acerifoliella (Zeller, 1839)
Phyllonorycter agilella (Zeller, 1846)
Phyllonorycter alnivorella (Ragonot, 1875)
Phyllonorycter alpina (Frey, 1856)
Phyllonorycter anceps Triberti, 2007
Phyllonorycter apparella (Herrich-Schäffer, 1855)
Phyllonorycter barbarella (Rebel, 1901)
Phyllonorycter belotella (Staudinger, 1859)
Phyllonorycter blancardella (Fabricius, 1781)
Phyllonorycter cavella (Zeller, 1846)
Phyllonorycter cephalariae (Lhomme, 1934)
Phyllonorycter cerasicolella (Herrich-Schäffer, 1855)
Phyllonorycter cerasinella (Reutti, 1852)
Phyllonorycter cerisolella (Peyerimhoff, 1872)
Phyllonorycter chrysella (Constant, 1885)
Phyllonorycter cocciferella (Mendes, 1910)
Phyllonorycter comparella (Duponchel, 1843)
Phyllonorycter connexella (Zeller, 1846)
Phyllonorycter coryli (Nicelli, 1851)
Phyllonorycter corylifoliella (Hübner, 1796)
Phyllonorycter delitella (Duponchel, 1843)
Phyllonorycter distentella (Zeller, 1846)
Phyllonorycter dubitella (Herrich-Schäffer, 1855)
Phyllonorycter emberizaepenella (Bouche, 1834)
Phyllonorycter endryella (Mann, 1855)
Phyllonorycter esperella (Goeze, 1783)
Phyllonorycter fraxinella (Zeller, 1846)
Phyllonorycter froelichiella (Zeller, 1839)
Phyllonorycter geniculella (Ragonot, 1874)
Phyllonorycter haasi (Rebel, 1901)
Phyllonorycter harrisella (Linnaeus, 1761)
Phyllonorycter heegeriella (Zeller, 1846)
Phyllonorycter helianthemella (Herrich-Schäffer, 1861)
Phyllonorycter hilarella (Zetterstedt, 1839)
Phyllonorycter ilicifoliella (Duponchel, 1843)
Phyllonorycter insignitella (Zeller, 1846)
Phyllonorycter joannisi (Le Marchand, 1936)
Phyllonorycter junoniella (Zeller, 1846)
Phyllonorycter klemannella (Fabricius, 1781)
Phyllonorycter kuhlweiniella (Zeller, 1839)
Phyllonorycter kusdasi Deschka, 1970
Phyllonorycter lantanella (Schrank, 1802)
Phyllonorycter lapadiella (Krone, 1909)
Phyllonorycter lautella (Zeller, 1846)
Phyllonorycter leucographella (Zeller, 1850)
Phyllonorycter maestingella (Muller, 1764)
Phyllonorycter mannii (Zeller, 1846)
Phyllonorycter mespilella (Hübner, 1805)
Phyllonorycter messaniella (Zeller, 1846)
Phyllonorycter millierella (Staudinger, 1871)
Phyllonorycter monspessulanella (Fuchs, 1897)
Phyllonorycter muelleriella (Zeller, 1839)
Phyllonorycter nicellii (Stainton, 1851)
Phyllonorycter nigrescentella (Logan, 1851)
Phyllonorycter oxyacanthae (Frey, 1856)
Phyllonorycter parisiella (Wocke, 1848)
Phyllonorycter parvifoliella (Ragonot, 1875)
Phyllonorycter pastorella (Zeller, 1846)
Phyllonorycter phyllocytisi (M. Hering, 1936)
Phyllonorycter platani (Staudinger, 1870)
Phyllonorycter populifoliella (Treitschke, 1833)
Phyllonorycter pseudoplataniella (Ragonot, 1874)
Phyllonorycter purgantella (Chretien, 1915)
Phyllonorycter quercifoliella (Zeller, 1839)
Phyllonorycter quinqueguttella (Stainton, 1851)
Phyllonorycter rajella (Linnaeus, 1758)
Phyllonorycter rebimbasi (Mendes, 1910)
Phyllonorycter robiniella (Clemens, 1859)
Phyllonorycter roboris (Zeller, 1839)
Phyllonorycter sagitella (Bjerkander, 1790)
Phyllonorycter salicicolella (Sircom, 1848)
Phyllonorycter salictella (Zeller, 1846)
Phyllonorycter scabiosella (Douglas, 1853)
Phyllonorycter schreberella (Fabricius, 1781)
Phyllonorycter scitulella (Duponchel, 1843)
Phyllonorycter scopariella (Zeller, 1846)
Phyllonorycter sorbi (Frey, 1855)
Phyllonorycter spinicolella (Zeller, 1846)
Phyllonorycter staintoniella (Nicelli, 1853)
Phyllonorycter stettinensis (Nicelli, 1852)
Phyllonorycter strigulatella (Lienig & Zeller, 1846)
Phyllonorycter suaveolentis (Petry, 1904)
Phyllonorycter suberifoliella (Zeller, 1850)
Phyllonorycter sublautella (Stainton, 1869)
Phyllonorycter tenerella (de Joannis, 1915)
Phyllonorycter trifasciella (Haworth, 1828)
Phyllonorycter triflorella (Peyerimhoff, 1872)
Phyllonorycter tristrigella (Haworth, 1828)
Phyllonorycter ulicicolella (Stainton, 1851)
Phyllonorycter ulmifoliella (Hübner, 1817)
Phyllonorycter viminetorum (Stainton, 1854)
Phyllonorycter vulturella (Deschka, 1968)
Povolnya leucapennella (Stephens, 1835)
Sauterina hofmanniella (Schleich, 1867)
Spulerina simploniella (Fischer von Röslerstamm, 1840)

Family Heliodinidae

Heliodines roesella (Linnaeus, 1758)

Family Heliozelidae

Antispila metallella (Denis & Schiffermüller, 1775)
Antispila treitschkiella (Fischer von Röslerstamm, 1843)
Heliozela hammoniella Sorhagen, 1885
Heliozela lithargyrellum (Zeller, 1850)
Heliozela resplendella (Stainton, 1851)
Heliozela sericiella (Haworth, 1828)
Holocacista rivillei (Stainton, 1855)

Family Hepialidae

Gazoryctra ganna (Hübner, 1808)
Hepialus humuli (Linnaeus, 1758)
Pharmacis bertrandi (Le Cerf, 1936)
Pharmacis carna (Denis & Schiffermüller, 1775)
Pharmacis fusconebulosa (DeGeer, 1778)
Pharmacis lupulina (Linnaeus, 1758)
Pharmacis pyrenaicus (Donzel, 1838)
Phymatopus hecta (Linnaeus, 1758)
Triodia sylvina (Linnaeus, 1761)

Family Heterogynidae

Heterogynis canalensis Chapman, 1904
Heterogynis penella (Hübner, 1819)
Heterogynis pravieli Leraut, 2006
Heterogynis valdeblorensis Leraut, 2006

References 

moths of Metropolitan France (D-H)